Ringerikes Blad is a local newspaper published in Hønefoss, Norway.

Johan Jørgen Krohn founded Ringerikes Blad in 1845. It covers Ringerike, Hole and Jevnaker.
It has a circulation of 12684, of whom 12227 are subscribers.

Ringerikes Blad is published by the company A-pressen Lokale Medier AS, which in turn is owned 100% by Amedia (formerly known as A-press), one of the largest media companies in Norway.

References

External links
 
 Norwegian Media Registry

Publications established in 1845
Daily newspapers published in Norway
Mass media in Buskerud
1845 establishments in Norway
Amedia
Companies based in Ringerike (municipality)